Norec (from English Norwegian Agency for Exchange Cooperation) is a Norwegian governmental body financing two-way mutual personnel exchange between companies and organisations in Norway and similar companies and organisations in the global South - that is countries in Africa, Asia and Latin America. Previous to 2018, the organisation was named FK Norway.

Norec was founded as Fredskorpset (meaning the Peace Corps in Norwegian) in 1963, based on ideas of John F. Kennedy's American Peace Corps. It was relaunched in 2000 to promote mutual international exchange of young people.

Norec is an administrative body, reporting to the Norwegian Ministry of Foreign Affairs. It funds exchange programmes between various colleges, organisations, businesses etc. in the southern and northern hemispheres.

By 2018, more than 9000 participants had been posted abroad for an average period of one year. FK Norway has regional networks in Asia, Africa, Latin America and Norway.

Tor Elden was secretary general and later director of FK Norway in the period 2000-2008. He was succeeded by Nita Kapoor, who was the director from 2009 to 2018. Jan Olav Baarøy has served as the Director General since 2018.

Until 2018, the head office was located in Oslo. That year it was moved to Førde as part of the national government’s decentralisation policy. It also has regional offices in Uganda and Thailand.

See also
 Peace Corps
 CUSO
 AmeriCorps
 British Romanian Educational Exchange
 European Voluntary Service
 International Voluntary Services
 JICA (Japan International Cooperation Agency)
 Korea International Cooperation Agency
 National Peace Corps Association
 Provincial Reconstruction Team
 United Nations Volunteers
 United States Cultural Exchange Programs
 Voluntary Service Overseas

References

External links 
 Official site
 Social site for the  global FK network

International volunteer organizations
Organisations based in Oslo
Government agencies of Norway
Organizations established in 1963
1963 establishments in Norway